Byarugaba Grace Isingoma (born 15 July 1962) is Ugandan politician who served in the ninth Parliament of Uganda under the National Resistance Movement political party representing Isingiro District.

Politics 
She was the Public Service and Local Government Committee who chaired the meeting and  recommended to parliament that the report of the committee of public service and local government be rejected  considering  the Lord Mayor Lukwago's petition afresh. She served as the Natural Resources committee who  was among the MPs who threatened to block the budget for the Ministry of Water and Environment unless  the ban on polythene bags, locally known as (Kavera) is implemented. This was during the analysing ministerial policy statement for 2011/2012 financial year that was held at the Parliament. Members of the Parliament (MPs) noted with concern the damage the continued use of Kavera are causing to the environment.

See also 
 List of members of the ninth Parliament of Uganda 
 Justine Ayebazibwe
 Parliament of Uganda
 National Resistance Movement

References

External links 
 https://www.pgaction.org/pdf/2014-07-17-Kampala-List-of-Participants.pdf
 https://gazettes.africa/archive/ug/2016/ug-government-gazette-dated-2016-03-03-no-14.pdf

Living people
1962 births
National Resistance Movement politicians
People from Isingiro District
Members of the Parliament of Uganda
Women members of the Parliament of Uganda